Abdi Bile (born 28 December 1962) is a former middle distance runner. He holds the highest number of national records in athletics in Somalia across various disciplines. He is currently Somalia's national record holder in nine athletic disciplines, and is thus far Somalia's most decorated athlete in history.

In 1987, he became world champion in the 1500 metres, the first Somali to do so. Bile ran the final 800m of the race in 1:46.0, which as of the 2020s, remains the fastest latter half in the history of the 1500m track race. During the semi-finals of the same championships, on 4 September 1987, he set a championship record with a time of 3:35.67 which lasted until 1 September 1991, when broken by Noureddine Morceli.

He defeated Britain's Sebastian Coe at the 1500m to win gold at the 1989 World Continental Cup. He also won silver at the same event in the 1985 African Championships in Cairo. In 1996 he represented Somalia at the 1996 Summer Olympics for the 1500 meters. His brother, Jama Bile, ran competitively for Northern Arizona University. His son Ahmed Bile ran competitively for Georgetown University.

Early life

He was born in Las Anod, Somalia and hails from the Nur Ahmed sub-clan of the Dhulbahante tribe. Abdi Bile grew up in a society where most of people were nomadic. He finished his high school in a school located in Erigavo. Abdi Bile started running when he first heard of the Somali runner Jamac Karacin who got scholarship into the US. This was when running became his hobby. When Abdi was a kid he was very interested in football/soccer. Abdi Bile was a great runner but not the only runner in his family. There were many of his other siblings who were interested in running at that time.

Running career
Bile won the 1500 m World Championship in 1987, running the final 800 m of the race in 1:46.00, the fastest final 800 m of any 1,500-metre race in history. He was a two-time Olympian (1984 and 1996) and dominated the event in the late 1980s. Bile was ranked first in the world at the mile distance in 1989. He was World Cup champion in the 1500 m in 1989 and two-time world Grand Prix final champion.

Bile graduated from George Mason University with a BSc in marketing management. At George Mason, Bile was team captain and a two-time NCAA Division I 1,500-metre champion, winning his first title in 1985 (3:41.20) and the second in 1987 (3:35.79). He also won many conference titles and held the inter-collegiate 1500 m record for more than ten years.

He was coached by John Cook, the former coach of 2008 Olympic 10,000-metre bronze medalist Shalane Flanagan. His career was riddled with injuries, and he missed the 1991 World Championships as well as the 1988 and 1992 Olympics because of such problems. In 1996 he finished sixth in the Olympic 1500 m final. As of the 2020s, Bile has the 17th fastest kilometer race of all time with a time of 2:14.50.

Achievements

Awards and national records

Bile has won gold medals in the 1987 World Championships in 1987 at the 1500m. In 1989 he won the gold medal at the World Continental Cup in Barcelona at the 1500m in a time of 3:35.56. In 1987, he won first place at the NCAA Championships in Baton Rouge, Louisiana at the 1500m in a time of 3:35.79. In 1993, he won second place at the 1500m in the Grand Prix Final in London UK, in a time of 3:34.65. In the same year, he also won the bronze medal at the World Championships at 1500m in Stuttgart, Germany in a time of 3:35.96. At the 1985 African Championships in Athletics, he won silver at the 1500m. Bile holds Somalia's national records in seven outdoor disciplines, namely the 800m, 1000m, 1500m, one mile, 2000m, 3000m and the 4x1500 metre relay as well as in two indoor disciples, namely the 1500m and the one mile, thus in a total of nine disciplines. The collapse of state institutions from 1990 onwards and injuries had prevented Bile from competing at the Olympics during his prime years.

Personal life
Bile has traveled widely and has inspired many young people and helped several humanitarian organizations. He is married, with two sons and daughter named Farhiya, born in 1995, Ahmed born 1993 and Mohamed born 2001.  As a senior in high school, Ahmed won the Virginia state cross country title, the 1000m title and 1600m title along with being a two-time New Balance All-American in the 800m. The largest stadium in Las Anod is named after him.

Notes

References

External links

 

1962 births
Living people
George Mason University alumni
George Mason Patriots men's track and field athletes
Somalian male middle-distance runners
Athletes (track and field) at the 1984 Summer Olympics
Athletes (track and field) at the 1996 Summer Olympics
Olympic athletes of Somalia
World Athletics Championships medalists
World Athletics Championships athletes for Somalia
Goodwill Games medalists in athletics
World Athletics Championships winners
People from Las Anod
Competitors at the 1994 Goodwill Games